Hok Sochetra (born 27 July 1974) is a retired Cambodian football player and manager.

International career
He was a member of the Cambodia national football team from 1995 to 2003.

International goals

Scores and results list Cambodia's goal tally first, score column indicates score after each Cambodia goal.

Coaching career
From July to October 2012, Sochetra coached the Cambodia national football team, but resigned after four defeats in the 2012 AFF Championship qualification phase.

References

External links
Profile at Soccerway.com
Profile at Soccerpunter.com

1974 births
Living people
Cambodian footballers
Cambodia international footballers
Association football forwards
Cambodian football managers
Cambodia national football team managers
Footballers at the 1998 Asian Games
Asian Games competitors for Cambodia
Phnom Penh Crown FC players